Alessandro Pavolini (27 September 1903 – 28 April 1945) was an Italian politician, journalist, and essayist. He was notable for his involvement in the Italian fascism government, during World War II, and also for his cruelty against the opponents of fascism.

Early life and career
A native of Florence, Pavolini was the son of Paolo Emilio Pavolini, a major scholar of Sanskrit and other Indo-European languages. A brilliant student, he earned a law degree at the University of Florence and a political science degree at La Sapienza in Rome, travelling to and from between the two cities. His brother was the writer Corrado Pavolini.

After joining Benito Mussolini's movement in Florence, he took part in several actions of the Blackshirts, and led a squad during the 1922 March on Rome – the moment when Fascism took over in Italy. Pavolini was assigned tasks in the cultural field (including youth programs launched by the fascists), while contributing to fascist publications such as Battaglie fasciste, Rivoluzione fascista, and Critica fascista. Thanks to his acquaintance with Florentine fascist leader Luigi Ridolfi, he broke into active politics, becoming Ridolfi's deputy in 1927. From 1929 to 1934, he was local leader of the National Fascist Party (PNF) in Florence, as well as editor of the fascist publication Il Bargello (named after a military rank of the Middle Ages), which urged all intellectuals to contribute; Pavolini aimed for an image of Fascism as cultural and aristocratic – he initiated a series of cultural events that survived both Fascism and his death, including the yearly costumed re-enactment of the Italian Renaissance-era sport Calcio Fiorentino, the Maggio Musicale Fiorentino music festival and the Ponte Vecchio Artisans' Exhibit. Between 1934 and 1942, he was a regular contributor to Corriere della Sera as a "special guest".

Prominence
After becoming a member of the national PNF leadership in 1932, he moved on from local politics to become the president of the Fascist Confederation of Professionals and Artists, which propelled him to a leadership position in the Council of Corporations. He took part in the Second Italo-Abyssinian War as a lieutenant inspecting the squadron led by Galeazzo Ciano (a group nicknamed La Disperata), and as a correspondent for Corriere della Sera. Throughout his political career, Pavolini published cultural and literary essays, such as Disperata ("The Desperate"; 1937) and Scomparsa d'Angela ("Angela's Disappearance"; 1940). In 1939, he was appointed by Mussolini Minister of Popular Culture, and served until January 1943.

Minister of Popular Culture (Minculpop in short) meant in fact Ministry of Propaganda and Pavolini had an iron grip on what the press could or could not publish. 
The written instructions to the press (including radio broadcasts and "Luce" cinema newsreels) were dubbed veline (tissue paper) by the newsmen and covered an amazing variety of domains (from forbidding to publish photos of boxer Primo Carnera knocked out and lying unconscious to the obligation of publishing flattering propaganda photos of Mussolini on a brand new Fiat tractor or forbidding to publish photos of Naples under the snow, fearing it would damage the tourism industry).

Minculpop also tackled the cinema industry (the famous and very creative Cinecitta studios in Rome were created by Mussolini's will to act as a counter against Hollywood productions; the Venice film festival is also a creation of the fascist period).

Pavolini was deeply involved in the cinema industry (either on the propaganda or on the entertainment sides of it) and famously had a much publicized affair with Doris Duranti, a film actress of the period who starred in the Telefoni Bianchi subgenre of light comedy films and prominently featured in the very first bare-bosomed scene in Italian cinema.

The Allied invasion of Sicily and the ousting of Mussolini in Rome brought Nazi intervention and the proclamation of a new fascist puppet state, the northern Italian Social Republic. Pavolini was integrated into the Republic's administration under Mussolini, and was immediately promoted head of the successor of the PNF, the Republican Fascist Party (PFR) (the only person to occupy that post); he took part in the drafting of major documents, including the Verona manifesto that called for the execution of former Grand Council of Fascism members who had voted against Mussolini in April, and was behind the creation of the paramilitary Black Brigades.

Capture and death

Pavolini was captured after a desperate escape attempt which saw him swimming across Lake Como and then trapped in a Mexican standoff over a half submerged rock. When Pavolini ran out of bullets, he was finally apprehended and executed by the partisans in Dongo.  Before burial, his body was hung upside down in public, along with Mussolini, Mussolini's mistress Clara Petacci, the former Party Secretary Achille Starace, Nicola Bombacci and others in Piazzale Loreto, Milan.

References

External links

 Italian Government (Archived 2009-10-25) at www.geocities.com
 

1903 births
1945 deaths
Politicians from Florence
Members of the Grand Council of Fascism
Culture ministers of Italy
Mussolini Cabinet
Deputies of Legislature XXIX of the Kingdom of Italy
Members of the Chamber of Fasces and Corporations
People of the Italian Social Republic
Italian essayists
Male essayists
Italian male writers
Journalists from Florence
Italian male journalists
20th-century Italian lawyers
20th-century essayists
Italian military personnel of World War II
Recipients of the Silver Medal of Military Valor
Executed politicians
Executed Italian people
People executed by Italy by firing squad
20th-century executions by Italy
20th-century Italian journalists
Italian male non-fiction writers